Devipatan division is an administrative geographical unit of Uttar Pradesh state of India. Currently (2005), the division consists of districts of: 
 Gonda, 
 Bahraich, 
 Shravasti, and 
 Balarampur.

Gonda is headquarters of this division.

History 
Devipatan division (Hindi: Mandal) was established on 21 November 1997.

References

Divisions of Uttar Pradesh
Devipatan division